Shesha, also known by his epithets Sheshanaga and Adishesha, is a serpentine demigod (naga) and Nagaraja (King of all serpents), as well as a primordial being of creation in Hinduism. In the Puranas, Shesha is said to hold all the planets of the universe on his hoods and to constantly sing the glories of Vishnu from all his mouths. He is sometimes referred to as Ananta Shesha, "Endless-Shesha", or Adishesha, the "First Shesha". It is said that when Adishesa uncoils, time moves forward and creation takes place; when he coils back, the universe ceases to exist.

The Narayana form of Vishnu is often depicted as resting on Shesha, accompanied by his consort Lakshmi. Adishesha is considered as one of the two mounts of Vishnu alongside Garuda. He is said to have descended upon Earth in the following human forms or incarnations: Lakshmana, brother of Vishnu's incarnation Rama during the Treta Yuga, and according to some traditions, as Balarama, brother of Vishnu's incarnation Krishna during the Dvapara Yuga. According to the Mahabharata (Adi Parva), his father was Kashyapa and his mother Kadru, though in other accounts, he is usually a primordial being created by Vishnu. 

His name means "he who remains", from the Sanskrit root śiṣ, because even as the world is destroyed at the end of each kalpa, Shesha remains as he is.

Form

Adishesha is generally depicted with a massive form that floats coiled through space, or upon the Ocean of Milk, to form the bed upon which Vishnu lays. Sometimes, he is depicted as a five-headed or seven-headed or a ten-headed serpent; but more commonly as one thousand-headed, or five thousand-headed, or even as many as a one million-headed serpent; sometimes with each head wearing an ornate crown.

Origin 
According to the Mahabharata, Adishesha was born to the sage Kashyapa and his wife Kadru. Kadru gave birth to a thousand snakes, of which Shesha was the eldest. After Shesha, Vasuki, Iravati and Takshaka were born, in that order. A lot of Shesha's brothers were cruel and were bent upon inflicting harm on others. They were even unkind to Garuda, who was Kashyapa's son through Vinata, sister of Kadru. (Kadru and Vinata were daughters of Daksha).

Shesha, disgusted by the cruel acts of his brothers, left his mother and kin, and took to austere penances. He lived on air and meditated in places including Gandhamadhana, Badrikashrama, Gokarna, Pushkara, and the Himalayas. His penances were so severe that his flesh, skin, and muscles dried up and merged with his frame. Brahma, convinced of Shesha's will, asked Shesha to request a boon. Shesha asked that he be able to keep his mind under control so that he could continue to perform ascetic penances. Brahma gladly accepted the request. Brahma then asked a favour of Shesha: to go beneath the precarious earth and stabilise it. Shesha agreed and went to the netherworld and stabilised Bhumi with his hood. He is believed to support her even today, thus making Patala his perennial residence.

Mahavishnu and Sankarshana

Shesha is usually depicted as floating in the ocean of the changing world, forming the bed of Mahavishnu.

In the Bhagavata Purana, Shesha is named Sankarshana, the tamasic energy of Narayana himself, and is said to live deep within the inner layers of Patala, where there are many serpents with gems on their heads and where he reigns as its ruler. He is said to have existed before the creation of the universe. When the universe is towards its end, he creates the 11 Rudras from the serpents to destroy the universe for a new one to be created.

Sankarshana is also one of the four vyuha forms of Vishnu, the other three being Vāsudeva, Pradyumna, and Aniruddha.

In Gaudiya accounts, Sankarshana expands himself as Garbhodakshayi-Vishnu in the beginning of the universe to create Brahma. In other words, Sankarshana is believed to be Narayana himself.

In the first few chapters of the Puranas, it is also said that Sankarshana preached the Bhagavata to the Four Kumaras, who in turn passed on this message. At some point, the message was passed to sage Maitreya, who in turn preached it to Vidura.

Avatars 

Adisesha is believed to have taken 6 incarnations on earth. During the Satya Yuga, he came down in his original form to form a seat for Vishnu's avatar of Narasimha, who had incarnated to slay the impious Hiranyakashipu.

During the Treta Yuga, Sesha took birth as Lakshmana, as Lord Vishnu's (as Rama) brother. Lakshmana is a very prominent character in the Ramayana, along with Hanuman and Sita.

During Dvapara Yuga, he is a stated to have incarnated as Balarama again as a brother to Vishnu (as Krishna). This is often disputed by the original line-ups of the Dasavatara, where Balarama is also considered to be an incarnation of Vishnu. 

During the Kali Yuga, according to Sri Vaishnava tradition, he was born as Patanjali Maharishi, Ramanujacharya, and Manavala Mamunigal. He was not accompanied by God during the Kali Yuga. Instead, he incarnated alone to spread devotion among the people, being a peaceful incarnation.

Sri Vaishnavism also states that Balarama is an incarnation of both Vishnu and Adishesha. In the Bhagavad Gita, in the middle of the battlefield Kurukshetra, Krishna, explaining his omnipresence, says: "Of Nāgas, I am Ananta" indicating the importance of Ananta Shesha.

Literature
The Brahma Purana describes the attributes of Ananta:

The Brahmanda Purana also described Shesha in Patala:
The Bhagavata Purana equates Shesha and Balarama:

In the Bhagavad Gita chapter 10, verse 29, Krishna describes 75 of his common manifestations, and declares, : Among Nāgas (a special class of serpents), I am the serpent-god Ananta.

In popular culture
The Palliyodam, a type of large snake boat built and used by Aranmula Parthasarathy Temple in Kerala for the annual water processions of Uthrattathi Jalamela and Valla Sadhya has the legend that it was designed by Krishna and were made to look like Shesha.

The capital of Kerala, Thiruvananthapuram, is named after the King of the Serpents and is translated as "The Sacred City of Ananta".

On the SCP Foundation wiki, the winning article for the SCP-3000 contest is titled Anantashesha. The article features SCP-3000, a gargantuan serpentine entity swimming in the Bay of Bengal with anomalous abilities, based on the fact that Shesha "would linger past the end".

Other names

 Sheshanaga (Sesha the serpent)
 Adishesha (the first Sesha)
 Anantashesha (Endless Sesha)
 Ananta (endless/infinite)
 Alternative spellings: Sesa, Sesha, 
 Shesha Sayana or Nagar Syana means Vishnu who sleeps (Sayana) on Sheshanaga

See also
 Vasuki
 Ouroboros
 Jörmungandr
 Manasa
 Nāga
 Snake worship
 Nagaradhane
 Padmanabhaswamy Temple

References

Bibliography

External links

 ananta supports the world (from mahAbhArata)
The Glories of Lord Ananta (from Śrimad Bhagavatam)
Ananta Sesha - The Legendary Serpent
Maha-Vishnu & Ananta Sesha
Image of ancient Vishnu and Sesha in deity form

Nāgas
Hindu gods
Lokapala
World-bearing animals
Vaishnavism
Mythical many-headed creatures
Legendary serpents
Snake gods